Jelgava District was an administrative division of Latvia, located in  Semigallia region, in the country's centre. It was organized into a city, two municipalities and twelve parishes, each with a local government authority. The administrative centre of the district was Jelgava.

Districts were eliminated during the administrative-territorial reform in 2009.

Cities, municipalities and parishes of the Jelgava District

 Eleja parish
 Glūda parish
 Jaunsvirlauka parish
 Kalnciems city
 Lielplatone parish
 Līvbērze parish
 Ozolnieki municipality
 Platone parish
 Sesava parish
 Sidrabene parish
 Svēte parish
 Valgunde municipality
 Vilce parish
 Vircava parish
 Zaļenieki parish

References 

Districts of Latvia